Nichatka is a fresh water body in the Kalarsky District, Zabaykalsky Krai, Russia. The name of the lake comes from the Evenki language word for "fish". 

Nichatka is located to the northeast of the great Baikal. There are no settlements on the banks of the lake. The nearest airfield is Chara Airport.

Geography
Nichatka is a long and narrow lake east of the gorges of the Vitim River, off the eastern limit of the Delyun-Uran Range. It stretches roughly from north to south at the southern end of the Patom Highlands and to the north of the Kodar Range. 

The Sen River, a tributary of the Chara, flows from the northern end of the lakeshore.There are other deep lakes nearby, such as Oron to the southwest, but Nichatka is the deepest of the lakes of the Chara river basin. The lake is frozen between October and May; in the winter the thickness of the ice my reach .

Fauna
Among the fish species in the lake, salmon, whitefish, grayling, soroga, perch, lenok, taimen and pike, deserve mention.

See also
List of lakes of Russia

References

External links
Nichatka lake (in Russian)
Open Kodar. Первый этап. Озеро Ничатка - Чита.Ру
Lakes of Zabaykalsky Krai
ru:Ничатка